James Bertram "Bert" Parnaby (4 March 1924 – 30 July 1992) was a British actor who was notable for a string of TV and Film roles from the 1960s through the 1980s. His TV roles included performances in Blackadder, By the Sword Divided, Juliet Bravo, Inspector Morse and Last of the Summer Wine. In 1988, he appeared as Father Christmas in the BBC adaptation of The Lion, the Witch and the Wardrobe. His film credits included Prick Up Your Ears (1987), The Dressmaker (1988) and The Reunion (1989).

Bert was also a schoolmaster, teaching English at Manchester Grammar School during the 1950s and early 1960s, and subsequently becoming an HMI (one of Her Majesty's Inspectors of Schools).

He died in July 1992 at the age of 68, shortly after the death of his wife Jane. A bench in their memory was later erected in Drummer Street, Cambridge.

References

External links 

1924 births
1992 deaths
English male television actors